De'Andre James Hunter (born December 2, 1997) is an American professional basketball player for the Atlanta Hawks of the National Basketball Association (NBA). He played college basketball for the Virginia Cavaliers and was named the NABC Defensive Player of the Year for 2019.

High school career
Hunter attended Friends' Central School in Wynnewood, Pennsylvania. As a junior, he averaged 21.6 points, 11.0 rebounds, and 5.0 assists per game, while being named Pennsylvania Class AA Player of the Year. As a senior in 2016, Hunter averaged 23.5 points, 9.8 rebounds, 3.0 assists and 2.5 blocks per game. Hunter was rated as a four-star recruit and ranked as the 72nd overall recruit and 14th best small forward in the 2016 high school class.

On September 12, 2015, Hunter committed to Virginia, choosing UVA over other offers from NC State and Notre Dame.

College career
During his redshirt freshman season, Hunter scored double figures in 16 games, including in 11 conference games.  During a game against Louisville, Hunter scored the final 3 pointer to win the game at the buzzer.  Hunter broke his wrist during the 2018 ACC tournament and could not play in the 2018 NCAA tournament.  Without Hunter, the number 1 seed Virginia went on to lose in the first round to the number 16 seed, UMBC.  After this season, Hunter was named to the All-ACC All-Freshman team, as well as being named the ACC Sixth man of the year. In his freshman season, Hunter posted 9.2 points and 3.5 rebounds per game. Hunter later announced that he would return to Virginia for the 2018–2019 season despite speculation that he could declare for the 2018 NBA draft.

In his sophomore season, Hunter averaged 15.2 points per game and 5.1 rebounds per game. He helped lead Virginia to another #1 seed in the 2019 NCAA tournament. Virginia would win the 2019 Championship game 85–77 behind Hunter's 27 points and 9 rebounds, including a game-tying 3 with 12.9 seconds left in regulation.

Following his second season, Hunter announced his intention to forgo his final two seasons of collegiate eligibility and declare for the 2019 NBA draft, where he was taken 4th overall by the Los Angeles Lakers and later traded to the Atlanta Hawks.

Professional career

Atlanta Hawks (2019–present)
On June 20, 2019, Hunter was drafted by the Los Angeles Lakers with the 4th overall pick in the 2019 NBA draft, and then traded to the New Orleans Pelicans in the Anthony Davis trade, and then again to the Atlanta Hawks along with Solomon Hill in exchange for picks Nos. 8, 17 and 35 in the 2019 NBA draft. On July 7, 2019, the Atlanta Hawks announced that they had signed Hunter. On October 24, 2019, Hunter made his NBA debut, starting in a 117–100 win over the Detroit Pistons and finishing with 14 points and two rebounds.

Hunter began the 2020–21 season in the starting lineup for the Hawks. 

On January 24, 2021, Hunter recorded a then career high of 33 points against the Milwaukee Bucks. On February 7, 2021, the Hawks announced that Hunter would undergo arthroscopic surgery on his right knee and would be out for an extended period of time. Going into the All-Star break, Hunter posted averages of 17.2 points per game and 5.4 rebounds per game, leading to the NBA naming him to the Rising Stars roster. On June 9, 2021, the Hawks announced that Hunter would undergo surgery to repair a torn right meniscus and would be out for the rest of the season. 

On April 26, 2022, Hunter scored a career high of 35 points and grabbed 11 rebounds. Despite his effort, the Hawks would lose the game 97–94 against the Miami Heat, eliminating them from the playoffs in five games.

On October 17, 2022, Hunter agreed on a four-year, $95 million contract extension with the Hawks.

On January 13, 2023, Hunter scored 26 points on a career-high six three-pointers made in a 113–111 win over the Indiana Pacers.

Career statistics

NBA

Regular season

|-
| style="text-align:left;"| 
| style="text-align:left;"| Atlanta
| 63 || 62 || 32.0 || .410 || .355 || .764 || 4.5 || 1.8 || .7 || .3 || 12.3
|-
| style="text-align:left;"| 
| style="text-align:left;"| Atlanta
| 23 || 19 || 29.5 || .484 || .326 || .859 || 4.8 || 1.9 || .8 || .5 || 15.8
|-
| style="text-align:left;"| 
| style="text-align:left;"| Atlanta
| 53 || 52 || 29.8 || .442 || .379 || .765 || 3.3 || 1.3 || .7 || .4 || 13.4
|- class="sortbottom"
| style="text-align:center;" colspan="2"| Career
| 139 || 133 || 30.7 || .434 || .359 || .785 || 4.1 || 1.6 || .7 || .4 || 13.2

Playoffs

|-
| style="text-align:left;"| 2021
| style="text-align:left;"| Atlanta
| 5 || 5 || 30.4 || .400 || .375 || .750 || 4.0 || .6 || .2 || .6 || 10.8
|-
| style="text-align:left;"| 2022
| style="text-align:left;"| Atlanta
| 5 || 5 || 34.9 || .557 || .462 || .800 || 3.8 || .6 || .8 || .2 || 21.2
|- class="sortbottom"
| style="text-align:center;" colspan="2"| Career
| 10 || 10 || 32.6 || .496 || .429 || .778 || 3.9 || .6 || .5 || .4 || 16.0

College

|-
| style="text-align:left;"| 2016–17
| style="text-align:left;"| Virginia
| style="text-align:center;" colspan="11"|  Redshirt
|-
| style="text-align:left;"| 2017–18
| style="text-align:left;"| Virginia
| 33 || 0 || 19.9 || .488 || .382 || .755 || 3.5 || 1.1 || .6 || .4 || 9.2
|-
| style="text-align:left;"| 2018–19
| style="text-align:left;"| Virginia
| 38 || 38 || 32.5 || .520 || .438 || .783 || 5.1 || 2.0 || .6 || .6 || 15.2
|- class="sortbottom"
| style="text-align:center;" colspan="2"| Career
| 71 || 38 || 26.6 || .509 || .419 || .773 || 4.4 || 1.6 || .6 || .5 || 12.4

References

External links

Virginia Cavaliers bio

1997 births
Living people
21st-century African-American sportspeople
African-American basketball players
All-American college men's basketball players
American men's basketball players
Atlanta Hawks players
Basketball players from Philadelphia
Friends' Central School alumni
Los Angeles Lakers draft picks
Shooting guards
Virginia Cavaliers men's basketball players